Chertow is a surname. Notable people with the surname include:

Ken Chertow (born 1966), American Olympian wrestler
Marian Chertow, American academic

See also
Chernow